Lauretum is a historic home located at Chestertown, Kent County, Maryland, United States. It is a large, three story late Victorian stuccoed frame house built in 1881 for Chestertown lawyer Harrison W. Vickers (1845-1911).  It features irregular massing, multiple roof forms, clipped gables, an oriel window, and exposed rafter ends.  It was designed by Baltimore architect Edmund G. Lind (1829-1909).

Lauretum was listed on the National Register of Historic Places in 1997.

References

External links
, including photo from 1997, at Maryland Historical Trust

Houses on the National Register of Historic Places in Maryland
Houses in Kent County, Maryland
Houses completed in 1881
Victorian architecture in Maryland
Historic districts on the National Register of Historic Places in Maryland
National Register of Historic Places in Kent County, Maryland
1881 establishments in Maryland